Bonnie E. John (born September 10, 1955) is an American cognitive psychologist who studies human–computer interaction, predictive human performance modeling, and the relationship between usability and software architecture. She was a founding member of the Human-Computer Interaction Institute at Carnegie Mellon University, a research staff member at IBM's Thomas J. Watson Research Center, and the director of computation and innovation at The Cooper Union. She is currently a UX designer at Bloomberg L.P.

Background 

A founding member of the Human-Computer Interaction Institute, established in 1993 at Carnegie Mellon University, she was previously an assistant professor in the Computer Science Department at Carnegie Mellon. She earned her Ph.D. in cognitive psychology at Carnegie Mellon University in 1988.
John has published over 100 technical papers in the area of human–computer interaction. She was elected to the CHI Academy in 2005. She was also a founding associate editor for ACM Transactions on Computer Human Interaction (TOCHI) and regularly serves on the ACM SIGCHI conference program committee. John was the director of the Masters in HCI Program in Human–Computer Interaction at Carnegie Mellon University from 1997 to 2009. John was a research staff member at IBM's Thomas J. Watson Research Center from December 2010 through December 2014. She returned to her alma mater, The Cooper Union, as the director of computation and innovation in December 2014. In July 2015 Bonnie joined Bloomberg's UX design team, to focus primarily on discoverability of new functionality on the Bloomberg Terminal.

Research 

John researches techniques to improve the design of computer systems with respect to their usefulness and usability. She has investigated the effectiveness and usability of several HCI techniques (e.g., think-aloud usability studies, Cognitive Walkthrough, GOMS) and produced new techniques for bringing usability concerns to the design process (e.g., CPM-GOMS and Usability-Supporting Architectural patterns). Her team at Carnegie Mellon University has developed CogTool, an open-source tool to support Keystroke-Level Model analysis.

Honors 
 2005—Elected to CHI Academy

References

External links 
 Bonnie E. John's Cooper Union projects, courses, publications, students, etc.
Bonnie E. John's IBM website
Bonnie E. John's Carnegie Mellon website
Human-Computer Interaction Institute

Human–computer interaction researchers
Carnegie Mellon University faculty
American cognitive scientists
Carnegie Mellon University alumni
Human-Computer Interaction Institute faculty
Cooper Union alumni
1955 births
Living people